Chaussy may refer to:

 An alternate name of Chavusy, a district town in Mahilyow Province, Belarus

Chaussy is the name of several communes in France:

 Chaussy, in the Loiret département
 Chaussy, in the Val-d'Oise département